Eltana is a small chain of Montreal-style bagel shops in Seattle, in the U.S. state of Washington. Established in 2010, the business has operated on Capitol Hill, in the Fremont and Wallingford neighborhoods, and in the food court at Seattle Center's Armory in the Queen Anne neighborhood. Eltana has also operated in Japan.

Montreal-style bagels are boiled in honey water and baked in a wood-fired oven. Eltana has also served salads, sandwiches, shakshouka, and Eastern Mediterranean / Middle Eastern cuisine.

Bradley Foster included Eltana in Thrillist's 2013 list of Seattle's eight "sweetest walk-up eat spots". Allecia Vermillion included the business in Seattle Metropolitan's 2022 overview of recommended eateries in Wallingford.

References

External links
 

2010 establishments in Washington (state)
Bagel companies
Companies based in Seattle
Restaurant chains in the United States
Restaurants in Japan
Restaurants in Seattle